Henry David Schlinger Jr. is an American psychologist known for his work in applied behavior analysis. He is a professor of psychology at California State University, Los Angeles, where he was formerly the director of the M.S. Program in Applied Behavior Analysis. He also holds a part-time position as an associate professor in the Chicago School of Professional Psychology's Applied Behavior Analysis program. He is a former editor-in-chief of both the Analysis of Verbal Behavior and the Behavior Analyst. He is a member of the Association for Behavior Analysis International and the board of trustees of the Cambridge Center for Behavioral Studies.

References

Behaviourist psychologists
Living people
Western Michigan University alumni
Southern Methodist University alumni
California State University, Los Angeles faculty
Academic journal editors
21st-century American psychologists
Year of birth missing (living people)